Abbeville County School District (ACSD) is a school district serving Abbeville County, South Carolina, United States. As of 2006 it serves some 3,700 students in all. Schools include Abbeville High School and  Dixie High School.

References

External links
Official website

School districts in South Carolina
Education in Abbeville County, South Carolina